The .45 Raptor is a rimless centerfire cartridge developed for the AR-10 semi-automatic rifle for medium and large game hunting.  Compared to similar big bore cartridges designed for the AR-15such as the .450 Bushmaster, .458 SOCOM, and .50 Beowulf the 45 Raptor offers higher velocity bullets, a flatter shooting trajectory and the ability to reliably feed hollow point ammunition.

History
Introduced in April 2014, the 45 Raptor was created by Arne Brennan.  Brennan is also known for his prior work with the 6.5 PPC cartridge for long range shooting, which contributed to the development of the 6.5 Grendel cartridge. The cartridge design is owned by Brennan's company North American Sportsman, LLC.

Design and specifications

The 45 Raptor is a straight wall rifle cartridge that mimics the size of the .460 S&W Magnum. Unlike the .460 S&W Magnum, the 45 Raptor has a rimless design that improves its ability to feed in semi-automatic firearms. The rim matches the specifications of a .308 Winchester cartridge. The first 2000 pieces of cartridge brass were processed (skived extractor rim) at Satern Rifle Barrel Co. This can be verified by the .460 S&W head bunting mark on the cartridge case. Barrels also came from Satern Rifle Barrel Co. in the 5R 1-20 twist rate

The 45 Raptor uses .460 S&W Magnum loading data and dies. A .308 Winchester shell holder is used during the loading process.

To convert an existing AR-10 from .308 Winchester to 45 Raptor, a new barrel with an extension needs to be installed. Additionally, existing magazines will need to be modified. The existing bolt and all other parts do not need to be changed.

Brennan moved the feed ramp from the AR-10 barrel extension to the detachable magazines. According to Brennan, this alteration is one reason why the 45 Raptor can feed wide-mouth hollow point rounds better than competing cartridges. Standard, straight-wall magazines are modified by shortening the follower and installing an insert that includes the feed ramp. Curved magazines can accept a custom made curved insert, and are also compatible with the 45 Raptor conversion. Magazine capacity is not altered.

The 45 Raptor is a relatively flat shooting cartridge to 200 yards. From muzzle to 200 yards, there is no more than a 3" rise or drop with bullet weights of 185 grains to 300 grains. This means a shooter can shoot into a 6" diameter circle at all distances to 200 yards with no hold over.

Proprietary status

North American Sportsman, LLC has filed for a trademark on the term Raptor as it relates to ammunition.  In an interview, Brennan stated he has no intention of charging royalties for the use of the trademark.  However, Brennan stated there will be certain requirements for anyone developing 45 Raptor products to ensure a minimum level of quality.

Sporting uses

In addition to general target shooting, the 45 Raptor is an appropriate round for hunting.  According to North American Sportsman, LLC, the cartridge is acceptable for taking medium and large game including hog and deer.

See also
 Thumper concept
 List of rifle cartridges
 .450 Bushmaster
 .458 SOCOM
 .460 S&W Magnum
 .50 Beowulf
 12.7×55mm STs-130
 .308 Winchester
 .375 Raptor

References

External links
 Forum thread with Arne Brennan discussing the 45 Raptor

45 Raptor|.45 Raptor
Subsonic rifle cartridges